Ernest Elgood Crawshaw (23 June 1889 – 9 October 1918) was a New Zealand cricketer who played first-class cricket for Canterbury. He died in France in World War I.

Life and career
Ernest Crawshaw was born in Christchurch and educated at Christchurch Boys' High School, where he captained the school's cricket and rugby teams. In 1908 he was awarded the school's inaugural Deans Memorial Scholarship, presented to a senior boy with outstanding personal qualities. He became an accountant, and married Elsie Lorraine Gunn Francis. They had one son.

He played cricket for Canterbury while still at school and appeared several times for them before World War I, making some useful contributions as a bowler and fieldsman.

During the war he enlisted in the 1st Battalion Canterbury Regiment and travelled as part of D Company 36th Reinforcements to France, sailing from Wellington in May 1918. A sergeant-major, he was killed in action at Le Cateau on 9 October 1918.

References

External links
 
 
 Ernest Elgood Crawshaw at Auckland Museum Online Cenotaph

1889 births
1918 deaths
New Zealand cricketers
Canterbury cricketers
New Zealand military personnel killed in World War I
Cricketers from Christchurch
People educated at Christchurch Boys' High School
New Zealand Military Forces personnel of World War I
New Zealand Army soldiers